Ramadan Ragap Mohamed Mohamed (born 13 June 1979) is an Egyptian football player.

Football career
Ramadan Ragap was transferred to Ankaragücü in summer 2003, signed a three-year contract. He was on loan to İstanbulspor A.Ş. in 2004/05 season.

References

External links
Profile at TFF

1979 births
Living people
Egyptian footballers
Expatriate footballers in Turkey
MKE Ankaragücü footballers
İstanbulspor footballers
Association football forwards